XHEB-FM and XEEB-AM is a radio station in Ciudad Obregón, Sonora. Broadcasting on 98.5 FM and 760 AM, XHEB is owned by Uniradio and carries a pop format known as La Zeta.

History
XEEB-AM 1010 received its concession on March 2, 1959. It was owned by Radiofónicas de Sonora, S. de R.L., and broadcast from Esperanza, Sonora. In 1972, it was sold to Radio XEEB, S.A., which marked the start of Grupo ACIR operation of the station and its move into Ciudad Obregón. In the early 2000s, XEEB increased its power by moving to 760 kHz.

Uniradio took control of XEEB in 2010 and moved it to FM, with transmitter facilities on Cerro La Cabana.

References

Radio stations in Sonora
Radio stations in Mexico with continuity obligations